Długie or Langenhagen in German is a village in the administrative district of Gmina Chociwel, within Stargard County, West Pomeranian Voivodeship, in north-western Poland.

The village has a population of 258.

Prior to 1945 was inhabited by Germans. It was part of the Neumark of the Margraviate of Brandenburg and later Province of Brandenburg. The last German mayor was Wilhelm Ladwig.

References

Villages in Stargard County